Aroa danva is a moth in the subfamily Lymantriinae described by William Schaus and W. G. Clements in 1893.

Distribution
This species is found in Cameroon and Sierra Leone.

References

Lymantriinae
Moths of Africa